Madi Hedd was an Australian actress. She appeared in a number of plays, television shows and films in Britain and Australia. From 1951 to 1957 she worked in Britain, appearing in a number of stage shows. She also appeared in Australian television dramas.

In 1969 she appeared alongside Noel Johnson in the BBC Radio 2 drama serial Find The Lady by David Ellis.

She was married to actor Bruce Beeby, who she met in 1946 and acted with in Sons of the Morning.

Select filmography
Ending It (1957) - TV
Lady in Danger (1959) - TV

References

External links

Year of birth missing
20th-century Australian actresses